This is a list of students associations in Canada.

Alberta

British Columbia

Manitoba

Newfoundland & Labrador

New Brunswick

See also
 New Brunswick Student Alliance

Nova Scotia

See also
 Alliance of Nova Scotia Student Associations
 Students Nova Scotia
 Canadian Federation of Students - Nova Scotia

Ontario

Prince Edward Island

Quebec

Saskatchewan

The Territories

National
 Black Law Students' Association of Canada
 Canadian Alliance of Student Associations
 Canadian Federation of Students
 Canadian Federation of Engineering Students
 Ukrainian Canadian Students’ Union
 Undergraduates of Canadian Research Intensive Universities
 Canadian Association of Business Students

Canada